A Severe Cyclonic Storm is a category used by the India Meteorological Department (IMD) to classify tropical cyclones, within the North Indian Ocean tropical cyclone basin between the Malay Peninsula and the Arabian Peninsula. The category was historically used to classify all tropical cyclones with winds above , however, it was bifurcated during 1988, when the IMD introduced a new category called Severe Cyclonic Storm with a core of hurricane winds. This new category was later further refined into Very Severe Cyclonic Storms, Extremely Severe Cyclonic Storms and Super Cyclonic Storms during 1999 and 2015.

Background
The North Indian Ocean tropical cyclone basin is located to the north of the Equator, and encompasses the Bay of Bengal and the Arabian Sea, between the Malay Peninsula and the Arabian Peninsula. The basin is officially monitored by the India Meteorological Department's Regional Specialized Meteorological Centre in New Delhi, however, other national meteorological services such as the Bangladesh and Pakistan Meteorological Department's also monitor the basin.

The Severe Cyclonic Storm category was historically used to classify all tropical cyclones with winds above , however, it was bifurcated during 1988, when the IMD introduced a new category called Severe Cyclonic Storm with a core of hurricane winds for all systems above . This new category was later further refined into Very Severe Cyclonic Storms, Extremely Severe Cyclonic Storms and Super Cyclonic Storms during 1999 and 2015.

Systems

Mandous

Climatology

References

External links
RSMC New Delhi

Severe cyclonic storms
NIO SCS